The Women's 3,000 metres Steeplechase event at the 2009 World Championships in Athletics was held at the Olympic Stadium on August 15 and August 17. The Russian steeplechase team entered for the event was particularly strong, featuring world record holder and Olympic champion Gulnara Galkina, defending world champion Yekaterina Volkova, and third fastest of the year Yuliya Zarudneva. Other possible medallists included Marta Domínguez, who had the world-leading time prior to the competition, American record holder Jenny Barringer, and world junior record holder Ruth Bisibori.

On the first day of competition, Galkina won heat one, with Germany's Antje Möldner finishing not far behind with a national record-breaking run. African athletes Zemzem Ahmed and Gladys Kipkemoi shared the winning time in the second heat, a race which saw the defending champion Volkova eliminated from the competition.

In the final, the favourite Galkina led upon the final lap, when Domínguez and Zarudneva sped ahead of the field. Domínguez kicked in the final straight to take her first World Championship gold medal in 9:07.32. This was a Spanish record and the fourth fastest of all time, in what was only her ninth race in the steeplechase. Zarudneva held on for the silver medal and Milcah Chemos Cheywa, a Kenyan newcomer, took the bronze, both athletes with a personal best. The former champion Galkina had faded into fourth place, and out of the medals. A number of athletes in the rest of the field recorded personal bests, with highlights including Habiba Ghribi and Antje Möldner running national records, and Jennifer Barringer setting a new North American record.

On November 19, 2015, the Court of Arbitration for Sport found Domínguez guilty of an anti-doping rule violation and ordered that  all competitive results obtained by Domínguez from 5 August 2009 be disqualified.  Earlier in 2015, silver medalist Yuliya Zarudneva (now known as Zaripova) received a doping ban that did not backdate to the 2009 World Championships, therefore Zarudneva was not advanced to gold

Medalists

Records

Jennifer Barringer improved her North American record by almost ten seconds, finishing with 9:12.50.

Qualification standards

Schedule

Results

Heats
Qualification: First 4 in each heat (Q) and the next 3 fastest (q) advance to the final.

Key:  NR = National record, PB = Personal best, Q = qualification by place in heat, q = qualification by overall place, SB = Seasonal best

Final

Key:  AR = Area record, NR = National record, PB = Personal best, SB = Seasonal best, WL = World leading (in a given season)

Note: Marta Domínguez was disqualified in November 2015. Gold Medal has been left vacated because Yuliya Zarudneva took drugs too and got a ban.

Splits

References
General
3000 metres steeplechase results. IAAF. Retrieved on 2009-08-16.
Specific

3000 steeplechase
Steeplechase at the World Athletics Championships
2009 in women's athletics